The Rural Municipality of Big Stick No. 141 is a rural municipality (RM) in the Canadian province of Saskatchewan within Census Division No. 8 and  Division No. 3. It is located in southwest portion of the province.

History 
The RM of Big Stick No. 141 incorporated as a rural municipality on December 11, 1911. The RM takes its name from the alkali Bigstick Lake within its boundaries, which was named after the Big Stick Trail between Maple Creek and the South Saskatchewan River – notable for a large, solitary tree along its route. A Big Stick Lake post office also operated at SE-27-14-26-W3 from 1911 to 1925.

Geography

Communities and localities 
The following urban municipalities are surrounded by the RM.

Villages
Golden Prairie

Demographics 

Government 
The RM of Big Stick No. 141 is governed by an elected municipal council and an appointed administrator that meets on the first Wednesday of every month. The reeve of the RM is Edward Feil while its administrator is Melinda Hammer. The RM's office is located in Golden Prairie.

References 

B